The Lorelei (or ,  or ; also found as Loreleï, Lore Lay, Lore-Ley, Lurley, Lurelei and Lurlei throughout history) is a , steep slate rock on the right bank of the River Rhine in the Rhine Gorge (or Middle Rhine) at Sankt Goarshausen in Germany, part of the Upper Middle Rhine Valley UNESCO World Heritage Site. The 1930s Loreley Amphitheatre is on top of the rock.

It has been an infamous maritime disaster site since its first records during the 10th century, with various myths ranging from dwarfs to lastly a siren trying to explain the high number of ship wrecks and the loud echo inside the passage.

Etymology

The name comes from the old German words , Rhine dialect for "murmuring", and the Celtic term  "rock". The translation of the name would therefore be "murmur rock" or "murmuring rock". The heavy currents, and a small waterfall in the area (still visible in the early 19th century) created a murmuring sound, and this combined with the special echo the rock produces to act as a sort of amplifier, giving the rock its name. The murmuring is hard to hear today owing to the urbanization of the area. Other theories attribute the name to the many boating accidents on the rock, by combining the German verb  ('to lurk, lie in wait') with the same "ley" ending, with the translation "lurking rock".

After the German spelling reform of 1901, in almost all German terms, the letter "y" was changed to the letter "i", but some proper nouns have kept their "y", such as Bayern, Speyer, Spay, Tholey, (Rheinberg-)Orsoy and including Loreley, which is thus the correct spelling in German.

Original folklore and modern myth

The rock and the murmur it creates have inspired various tales. An old legend envisioned dwarfs living in caves in the rock.

In 1801, German author Clemens Brentano composed his ballad Zu Bacharach am Rheine as part of a fragmentary continuation of his novel Godwi oder Das steinerne Bild der Mutter. It first told the story of an enchanting female associated with the rock. In the poem, the beautiful Lore Lay, betrayed by her sweetheart, is accused of bewitching men and causing their death. Rather than sentence her to death, the bishop consigns her to a nunnery. On the way thereto, accompanied by three knights, she comes to the Lorelei rock. She asks permission to climb it and view the Rhine once again. She does so, and, thinking that she sees her love in the Rhine, falls to her death; the rock ever afterward retaining an echo of her name. Brentano had taken inspiration from Ovid and the Echo myth.

In 1824, Heinrich Heine seized on and adapted Brentano's theme in one of his most famous poems, "Die Lorelei". It describes the eponymous female as a sort of siren who, sitting on the cliff above the Rhine and combing her golden hair, unwittingly distracted shipmen with her beauty and song, causing them to crash on the rocks. In 1837 Heine's lyrics were set to music by Friedrich Silcher in the art song "Lorelei" that became well known in German-speaking lands. A setting by Franz Liszt was also favored and dozens of other musicians have set the poem to music. During the Nazi regime and World War II, Heinrich Heine (born as a Jew) became discredited as author of the lyrics, in an effort to dismiss and hide Jewish contribution to German art. Lorelei also appears in the poem Waldesgespräch, which appears as a dialog in Joseph von Eichendorff's first novel, . The poem was set by Robert Schumann in his Liederkreis, op. 39.

The Lorelei character, although originally imagined by Brentano, passed into German popular culture in the form described in the Heine–Silcher song and is commonly but mistakenly believed to have originated in an old folk tale. The French writer Guillaume Apollinaire took up the theme again in his poem "La Loreley", from the collection Alcools which is later cited in Symphony No. 14 (3rd movement) of Dmitri Shostakovich. The character continues to be referenced in pop culture.

Accidents
A barge carrying 2,400 tons of sulphuric acid capsized on 13 January 2011, near the Lorelei rock, blocking traffic on one of Europe's busiest waterways.

Gallery

See also
 Siren - Ancient Greek
 Sirin - Russian

References

External links

 Loreley Information about the Lorelei rock and surrounding area
 Die Lorelei – Heinrich Heine's poem with English translation
 The Lorelei – Translation of the tale, from Ludwig Bechstein's German Saga Book
 Recordings from the Cylinder Preservation and Digitization Project; search results for Loreley and Lorelei

Rock formations of Rhineland-Palatinate
German folklore
Medieval legends
Heinrich Heine
German legends
Middle Rhine
Volkslied